The Twentieth Canadian Ministry was the first cabinet chaired by Prime Minister Pierre Trudeau.  It governed Canada from 20 April 1968 to 4 June 1979, including all of the 28th, 29th, and 30th Canadian Parliaments.  The government was formed by the Liberal Party of Canada.  Trudeau was also Prime Minister in the Twenty-Second Canadian Ministry (1980–1984).

Ministers

References

Succession

20
Ministries of Elizabeth II
1968 establishments in Canada
1979 disestablishments in Canada
Cabinets established in 1968
Cabinets disestablished in 1979